Kranea (Greek: Κρανέα) may refer to:
Kranea, a community in Preveza regional unit
Kranea, Grevena, a village in Grevena regional unit
Kranea, Karditsa, a village in Karditsa regional unit
Krania, Elassona, a village in Larissa regional unit
Krania, Kato Olympos, a village in Larissa regional unit
Kranea, Pella, a village in Pella regional unit
Kranea, Trikala, a village in Trikala regional unit